is a fictional character from the Darkstalkers series of fighting games by Capcom, where she is an optimistic American catgirl who was raised in a convent. Introduced in the 1994 game Darkstalkers: The Night Warriors and its subsequent sequels, she has also appeared in other games outside of the Darkstalkers series and related media and merchandise, becoming one of the most popular Capcom characters.

Appearances

Video games
Felicia is a catwoman who was taken in and raised by a Catholic nun named Rose. When Rose died, Felicia left home hoping to become a pop star. She knew that the outside world was not pretty as it was filled with much prejudice towards Darkstalkers for being different. Despite this, Felicia never lost hope, as she remembered what she was told before that one has to obtain happiness on one's own. She wishes there to be a way for peaceful coexistence between Darkstalkers and humans alike. For that, she pursues her dream of becoming a star to serve as a bridge between them. During her travels, she met many other catgirls of her kind, and with her newfound friends (Alto, Grace, Lucy, Nana & Mimi, Nonno, and Piko), she set out for her dream of being on stage.

Besides the Darkstalkers series, Felicia appears as a playable character in several other video games (not only limited to the fighting game genre), including Capcom Fighting Evolution, Cross Edge, Marvel vs. Capcom 2: New Age of Heroes, Marvel vs. Capcom 3: Fate of Two Worlds, Pocket Fighter (where she can change into Mega Man), Puzzle Fighter, Project X Zone 2, SNK vs. Capcom: The Match of the Millennium, Ultimate Marvel vs Capcom 3 and Puzzle Spirits. She has also appeared in card-based games, including SNK vs. Capcom: Card Fighters Clash, Street Fighter: Battle Combination and Onimusha Soul (redesign to fit it feudal Japan theme). In the crossover tactical role-playing game Namco × Capcom, Felicia teams up with King II from Tekken to make the only two-character team in the game to include both a Namco character and a Capcom character. A cosplay costume of her can be worn by Nick Ramos in Super Ultra Dead Rising 3 Arcade Remix Hype EX Plus Alpha DLC. Felicia appears as the main character of a puzzle game for mobile phones, .

Conception and design

The character was originally envisioned by Capcom producer and Darkstalkers original creator Alex Jimenez as a beautiful long-legged African vampiress who could transform into a jaguar. Early in the development of Darkstalkers, the team decided to have two female characters: a catgirl and a vampiress, characters who would eventually become Felicia and Morrigan, respectively. Initially, Morrigan was to be the "cute" female character of the title, while Felicia would be the "sexy" female character. However, as Morrigan's character developed into that of a succubus she was made to be far more sexually appealing, and the roles of the two characters were reversed.

Felicia is a curvaceous cat woman, and as such, has cat ears, a mane of long, blue hair, pointed teeth, a tail, and oversized paw-like, clawed hands and feet that she uses in battle. She is completely nude, and is only covered up by white fur partially obscuring her breasts, stomach, hips and crotch in thin strips, and entirely covering her arms and legs. Her name is adapted from the name Felicity. Gameplay-wise, Felicia uses quick nimble attacks and has particularly long combos. According to MAXIMUM magazine's guide to Darkstalkers: The Night Warriors, Felicia is one of the "best characters available, with overwhelming speed and a wide range of easily performed specials", notable for her ability to "jump of the wall Chun-Li style", in addition to her "rather controversial 34 EX [combo]" being "incredibly easy to use and utterly devastating".

Other media

Film and television
Felicia is the main hero in the American cartoon series Darkstalkers (1995), in which she was accompanied by Harry Grimoire, a character created for this particular series whose purpose (aside from a plot device) was mainly to get Felicia into trouble. She is also stated to be several hundred years old in this. Her dreams of being a singer are never mentioned (although in the first episode she was fired from Cats because her "costume" was "out of date"). Felicia was also depicted as possibly being the last of her kind, despite having other catgirl friends in the game series itself.

The anime OVA Night Warriors: Darkstalkers' Revenge (1997), Felicia is shown as already having a certain amount of success as an entertainer and is just starting a tour in the human world with her own traveling show. Her tour gets off to a rough start when she is almost killed by monks pertaining to an anti-darkstalker militia and the zombie Lord Raptor saves her by promptly killing them all. Later, as Pyron begins his bid for world domination, Felicia attacks his Huitzil robot army. She destroys a few of the robots before being overwhelmed, but she is saved when the werewolf Jon Talbain intervenes. She is taken in by a human doctor and befriends the local children, only to be captured by a human paramilitary group. The doctor rescues her and with her faith in humanity renewed she, along with Talbain, lures the robots out of the town and destroying them with an explosives laden train. In this interpretation of Felicia, her origin is not mentioned, and she is ambivalent to organized religion.

Literature
In the UDON Comics version of Darkstalkers, Felicia is still looking for her big break into stardom; unfortunately being a catgirl proves to be a very large roadblock on the path to fame. Along the way, she runs into Talbain who believes that humans are treacherous and vile, while she thinks that the current hatred between humans and darkstalkers are just a few "bumps in the road". Despite the fact that his interference costs her a potential gig, Felicia asks Talbain to accompany her, so that she can try to prove to him that humanity is not all bad. Eventually, they end up at the Catholic orphanage where Felicia grew up; her foster mother is named Sister Cecillia and is still alive and active in her foster daughter's life.

Merchandise and guest appearances
Several figurines of Felicia have been made since her introduction, ranging from immobile figurines by companies such as Kaiyodo, Volks, Yujin, Clayz, Kotobukiya, and MIT Japan, to a posable action figure by Medicom Toy. She is also a character card in the collectible card game Universal Fighting System.

In the shōnen manga series Love Hina, a few of the main female characters appear in the costumes of B.B. Hood, Hsien-Ko, and Felicia—though much less revealing—for Halloween in chapter 86 of the manga. In the Cartoon Network animated series Mad (2011), Felicia makes a cameo in the season one segment "Gaming's Next Top Princess".

Reception
Felicia has been well received by fans and critics as one of the Darkstalkers series' top characters as well as for her sex appeal. In 2013, the staff of GamesRadar included her among the thirty best characters in Capcom's three-decade history: "Felicia has the grace, agility and claws that fit her cross species, with body language that comes off more cat than human, and it extends to her personality as well. Behind Morrigan, she's likely the most well known Darkstalker, and has had cameos and playable appearances in multiple games. But when will she get the spotlight she deserves in a true Darkstalkers comeback?" In a preview of Project X Zone, they added "Felicia's popularity dates back to an earlier, more innocent time. Back then, few were up in arms about a sexy, barely dressed half-cat girl. It was especially forgivable when her in-game style could be summarized as two parts Blanka and one part Sonic the Hedgehog." GameDaily named Felicia one of their favorite Capcom characters of all time, ranking her as fifth on their list of their top 25 as well as their favorite female Darkstalkers character. PLAY magazine described her as one of Capcom's "most beloved characters", featuring her in their "Girls of Anime" special. GameDaily listed her as one of their favorite American female characters in video games. Paul Tassi of online magazine Unreality held a "Queen of the Iron Fist" bracket tournament in 2008 that rated thirty-two female fighting-game characters, in which Felicia defeated Mortal Kombat character Kitana, but then lost in the second round to Sophitia from the Soul series. Retrospectively, Japanese video game magazine Famitsu included her among the best heroines of the 1990s in a 2015 list. In 2016, German magazine M! Games ranked her as the second "coolest" cat in video games.

The character is a popular subject of cosplay, such as by Francesca Dani. In 1996, Capcom's representatives were quoted as saying: "If we add female characters [to our games], it is very popular. Have you every been to the  show in Japan? People dress up as Morrigan or Felicia to play the games". According to GameFront's Phil Owen, her "costume is quite elaborate, which means it's easy to f–k up". The 2009 book 500 Essential Anime Movies: The Ultimate Guide cited Felicia as an example of the popularity of the Darkstalkers character designs, with fans frequently cosplaying as the character at various conventions since the original game's release.

Sex appeal
Felicia is often considered to be one of the most sexually attractive characters in video gaming. Featuring Morrigan and Felicia in their Girls of Gaming special in 2003, Play wrote that the two are famous for how they "unified the haunting with the erotic, along with previously unseen level of animation and creature design". She also appeared in volume 2 of Play's "Girls of Gaming" series, noted as one of the greatest female characters in fighting games and with a comment: "What can you say about a cat-girl that wears something so skimpy it barely passes as an outfit?" In 2012, Larry Hester of Complex ranked her as the "22nd-hottest" video game character, while MSN included her among the 20 "hottest women in video game history". UGO Networks' Aubrey Sitterson ranked Felicia among "fighting games' hottest women", commenting: "The fact that we think about her purring when we scratch her pushes us dangerously close to the Furry border". GamesRadar placed Felicia third on their list of the fifty "hottest game babes"  and Playboy featured her among the "hottest video game breasts of all time". Patrick Roesle of Hardcore Gaming 101 remarked: "All you need to know about Felicia is that she's extremely agile, emits piercing shrieks during battle, and has starred alongside [Jon] Talbain in more hentai/slash fanfiction than you can probably wrap your mind around".

On the other hand, Sega Saturn Magazine described her as "too cute for her own good", questioning her viability compared to other characters in the franchise. In 2012, Chad Hunter of Complex ranked her as the ninth-most stereotypical character in video games (representing "Nearly Nude Female Fighters"), commenting how the "slutty innocent fighter girl stereotype was blasted off the charts with Felicia" while adding that she was "embarrassing and a weak character on top of it. This kitty cat should be put down for good". PC World included her in their list of "video game characters that are supposed to be sexy...but aren't".

See also
List of Darkstalkers characters
Bakeneko

References

External links
 Felicia's Darkstalkers and Marvel vs. Capcom 2  entries at StrategyWiki.org

Adoptee characters in video games
Anthropomorphic video game characters
Capcom protagonists
Catgirls
Dancer characters in video games
Darkstalkers characters
Female characters in anime and manga
Female characters in video games
Fictional American people in video games
Fictional characters from Las Vegas
Fictional Christian nuns
Fictional werecats
Kemonomimi
Musician characters in video games
Orphan characters in video games
Singer characters in video games
Video game characters introduced in 1994
Woman soldier and warrior characters in video games